Sadije Toptani (Tirana, 28 August 1876 – Durrës, 25 November 1934) was queen mother of Albania from September 1928 until her death. She was the mother of Zog I of Albania.

Biography 
Sadije (also Sadijé, Sadiya or Khadija) was a member of the powerful Toptani family, Sadije was the daughter of Salah Bey Toptani (1843−1910) and his wife, Annijé Toptani (1855−1899), both members by birth of the Toptani family. Also she was a cousin to Essad Pasha Toptani. She was the second wife of Xhemal Pasha Zogu after the death of his first wife, Melek Hanem.

After her son became king in 1928, she was raised to the title Nëna Mbretëreshë e Shqiptarëve, or Queen Mother of the Albanians, with the style of Her Majesty on September 1, 1928, a position she held until her death. She supervised the Royal Kitchen to ensure that her son could not be poisoned. She was the official protector of the Gruaja Shqiptare.

Sadije Toptani was a Bektashi Muslim.

Death
Sadije died in the Royal Compound in Durrës and was buried in Tirana the next day. A royal mausoleum was constructed to house her remains. The building was destroyed by Albanian communist forces on 17 November 1944.

Issue

References

Bibliography
 Patrice Najbor, Histoire de l'Albanie et de sa maison royale (5 volumes), JePublie, Paris, 2008,.
 Patrice Najbor, la dynastye des Zogu, Textes & Prétextes, Paris, 2002
 O.S. Pearson, Albania and King Zog, I.B. Tauris. 2005.

External links 
Maison royale d'Albanie, site officiel en langue française
Famille royale d'Albanie, site officiel en langue anglaise

Toptani, Sadije
Toptani, Sadije
20th-century Albanian people
19th-century Albanian people
House of Zogu
Queen mothers
People from Tirana
People from Scutari vilayet
Albanian Muslims
Sadije
Sadije
19th-century Albanian women
20th-century Albanian women